The Yamaha MU-series is a line of sound modules built by Yamaha. All sound modules except MU5 support Yamaha XG. The sound modules were commonly used when computers had slower processors. The computer could send MIDI commands to the sound module, acting as an external sound generation device. Later MU sound modules feature A/D inputs that allow direct input from microphones and guitars.

The MU-series product line superseded the company's previous TG-series modules, the TG100 and TG300. Although the majority of Yamaha's MU-series modules were meant for the home user, the company also made rack-mount versions of the MU90 and MU100 called the MU90R and MU100R, respectively, for professional use.

Compatibility 
MU50 and higher end models typically offer the following compatibility modes:
 XG mode, also used for General MIDI
 TG300B mode offers compatibility with Roland GS. In the MU1000EX and MU2000EX replaced by a licensed GS mode.
 C/M mode offers limited compatibility with the Roland MT-32 and the CM-32L.
 Yamaha Disk Orchestra Collection mode
The unit will automatically switch between XG and TG300B modes as required. C/M mode has to be enabled manually.

List of MU-series sound modules

References

Further reading

External links 
 Yamaha Manual Library
Sealed's Deep Synthesis Page - MU10 Related Models (archive)

Sound modules
MU-series
Samplers (musical instrument)